Camilo César Jiménez Ballón (born 2 July 1996) is a Peruvian footballer who plays as a centre-back for Peruvian Segunda División side Sport Chavelines.

Club career

FK Zeta
Jiménez is a product of Universidad San Martín. At the age of 18, Jiménez went on a trial at Montenegrin club FK Zeta in January 2015. He played his first game for the club on 31 January 2015 in a friendly game against FK Dečić. In mid-February, he officially signed with the Montenegrin club.

He got his official debut for the club on 11 March 2015 against OFK Petrovac. Jiménez started on the bench, before replacing Luka Klikovac in the 66th minute. He played a total of six games for Zeta.

Return to Peru
Jiménez returned to Peru and played a season with his former club Universidad San Martín, acting on the club's reserve team. In 2017 he moved to Deportivo Hualgayoc in the Peruvian Segunda División, before joining fellow league club, Carlos A. Mannucci, on 2 February 2018. With 24 appearances in 2018, he helped Manucci securing promotion to the Peruvian Primera División for the 2019 season.

On 3 January 2020 it was confirmed, that Jiménez had joined Peruvian Primera División club FC Carlos Stein on a one-year deal. After a year at Stein, Jiménez moved to Sport Boys for the 2021, confirming the deal on 22 December 2020.

In January 2022, Jiménez moved to Peruvian Segunda División side Sport Chavelines.

International career
Jímenez has played games for both the Peruvian U15 and U17 national teams. He was also called up for the Peruvian U20 national team, but never made his debut.

References

External links
 
 

Living people
1996 births
Association football defenders
Peruvian footballers
Peruvian expatriate footballers
People from Lima
Montenegrin First League players
Peruvian Segunda División players
Peruvian Primera División players
Club Deportivo Universidad de San Martín de Porres players
FK Zeta players
Carlos A. Mannucci players
FC Carlos Stein players
Sport Boys footballers
Expatriate footballers in Montenegro